Indian Joe, (Captain Joe, Old Joe, Jo Indian, Joe Injun, Abenaki translation of Joseph: Susapp) was a Native American scout.

Biography 
Born near Louisbourg, Nova Scotia of Mi'kmaq origin, he was adopted by Abenaki people, who took him to St. Francis (today's Odanak). He served as a scout under Colonel Jacob Bayley (1726-1815). He was injured in the Rogers' Rangers raid on the village. He eventually moved to the area of Cowass (today's Newbury, Vermont).

During the American Revolutionary War, Joe again served under Jacob Bayley and later under Moses Hazen. After the war, he and Molly lived in Danville, Vermont and on an island on what is now called Joe's Pond in Danville. Joe died on February 19, 1819, after he fell and was injured by the severe cold. His burial was paid for by Frye Bayley, and he was given a military style funeral.

Legacy 
Several places are named after Joe and Molly:
 Joe's Pond between present day Danville and Cabot 
 Joe's Brook, outlet of Joe's Pond
 Molly's Pond in Cabot

Other tributes:
 "A Dirge for Jo Indian", composed in 1922, by Eastwood Lane as part of his Adirondack Sketches

See also 
Military history of the Mi’kmaq people

References

Further reading
 Johnson Family of Newbury [VT] Papers, 1775-1886, Docs. 574.76.1 & 575.33, MSA 426.28, Vermont Historical Society.
 William Parker Neal, Indian Joe Trilogy: Indian Joe The Friendly Indian Guide, Indian Joe The Famous Abenaki, Molly - Squaw of Indian Joe. [Danville, VT: United Methodist Church & the author, 1976-?]. (See http://www.joespondvermont.com/products.html)
 Frederic P. Wells, History of Newbury, Vermont ... St. Johnsbury, VT: Caledonian, 1902.

Mi'kmaq people
Abenaki people
18th-century Native Americans
19th-century Native Americans
Native American history of Vermont
Year of birth unknown
1819 deaths
1730s births